Skałka is a burial place for distinguished Poles, in Kraków.
Skałka may also refer to:

Skałka, a play by Stanisław Wyspiański, 1907
Skałka, Lower Silesian Voivodeship (south-west Poland)
Skałka, Silesian Voivodeship (south Poland) 
Skałka, Świętokrzyskie Voivodeship (south-central Poland)

See also
 
Skalka (disambiguation)